The Chelaalapí Qom Choir was created in 1962 in the Toba neighborhood in the outskirts of the city of Resistencia, Chaco, and became the first indigenous choir established in Latin America. The choir's name means "flock of thrushes".

It was declared a symbol of Chaco's cultural heritage by decree No. 1.491/2022 of the Province's government. In 2006, UNESCO recognized the choir as part of the 'living cultural heritage of the Chaco Province.

Trajectory 
The choir was recognized and officially declared as Cultural Ambassador to the Qom people (Toba people), Chaco Province's Official Choir, Cultural Heritage and Symbol of Chaco’s Culture by the Province's Government, Living Cultural Heritage of Chaco (as proposed by UNESCO-2006), Living Cultural Heritage (Chamber of Deputies of Chaco) and declared of Cultural Interest (Argentine Senate, April 2008).

The first group rehearsals, driven by Inés García de Márquez, were a cappella and with percussive jingles made of mate, N'vike or Novike (tin violin), rainsticks, and bass drums; eventually, chajchas were incorporated.

During their 60 years of existence, the Chalaalapí Qom Choir performed on many provincial, national and international stages, and in more than one of them they shared their knowledge through workshops and activities. In their long trajectory, the choir made several musical experiments, including fusion concerts with Latin American and international artists.

Discography 

 Coro Chelaalapí Meets Lagartijeando (2019, Big In Japan)
 Remixes & Raíces (2018, Instituto de Cultura Chaco)
 Remixes Coro Chelaalapí (2017, ICC / Club del Disco)

Live Shows 
In 2018, the choir represented Chaco in company of the sound artist, producer and DJ Matías Zundel in neighboring countries and Europe on a trip which took them to Asunción, Madrid, Berlín, and other capitals. In 2019, they started and ended the year with the Chelaalapí Fest, first in Resistencia and the second one in the Recoleta Cultural Center in Buenos Aires. They also had a show at the Ancestral and Contemporary Festival, at the Rosario Flag Festival, and at Cordoba's Belle Epoque Club.

In 2020, the cast was invited to participate of the Tribal Gathering, event which takes place in Panamá and gathers over 60 tribes of around the globe to exchange experiences, engage in discussions, and perform musical shows. 'The members of the choir consider themselves to be cultural ambassadors whose artistic expressions make their ancestral legacy public in every show in Argentina and the world. They are a constituent element of the rich, diverse and intercultural identity of Chaco', added Culture’s president.

Members

Past Members 
Gregorio Segundo (Shetoqshe), Rito Largo (Vaisogoshe),  Amancio Sánchez, Félix Núñez,  Oscar Oliva, Mario Morales (Itaic),  Zunilda Méndez (Igliaque),  Florencio Lezcano (Chiglioyi).

Members as of 2021 
Rosalía Patricio, Enriqueta Escobilla, Santa Oliva, Rosa Largo, Griselda Morales, Zulma Núñez, Claudio Largo, Elvio Mansilla, Omar Toledo, Diego Castro, Horacio Patricio, Pablo Mansilla y Román Gómez.

Deceased Thrushes 

 Erinda Martínez: Musical model, sharing her wisdom and love for music and song with the rest of the community and especially with the younger ones.
 Zunilda Méndez: Founding member of the Chelaalapí Qom Choir from Chaco. Her name was Igliaqueque, which means ‘brave grandmother’. A woman of serene eyes and precise words, she always had advice ready. She was of great importance in the neighboring Province.
 Juan Rescio: Musician, basket maker and direct modeling potter, he was a fundamental piece of our intercultural identity.
 Gregorio Segundo: Renown luthier of the Chelaalapí Qom Choir. His specialty was making n’viké, a violin which makes a particular sound, one of the most distinctive hallmarks of Chaco's music.
 Juana Núñez: Choir member, artisan and luthier, she carried out workshops about native instruments, always preserving indigenous knowledge.
 Ignacio Mancilla: Qom artist who played the folkloric bass drums in the choir, and who contributed with his music to the conservation and dissemination of the indigenous peoples' culture.

References 

Choirs
Indigenous music of South America
Chaco Province
Argentine musical groups